Pak Ngau Shek Ha Tsuen is a village in Lam Tsuen, Tai Po District, Hong Kong.

Administration
Pak Ngau Shek Ha Tsuen is a recognized village under the New Territories Small House Policy.

History
At the time of the 1911 census, the population of Pak Ngau Shek was 53. The number of males was 22.

See also
 Pak Ngau Shek Sheung Tsuen

References

External links
 Delineation of area of existing village Pak Ngau Shek Ha Tsuen (Tai Po) for election of resident representative (2019 to 2022)

Villages in Tai Po District, Hong Kong
Lam Tsuen